The New Zealand national rugby union team toured Canada and the Britain and Ireland in October and November 1989, playing test matches against the national teams of Wales and Ireland and tour matches against 12 other sides, including the Barbarians. They went unbeaten on the tour, winning all 14 matches.

Squad
Coach: Alex Wyllie

Results 
Scores and results list New Zealand's points tally first.

British Columbia vs New Zealand

Cardiff vs New Zealand

Pontypool vs New Zealand

Swansea vs New Zealand

Neath vs New Zealand

Llanelli vs New Zealand

Newport vs New Zealand

Wales vs New Zealand

Leinster vs New Zealand

Munster vs New Zealand

Connacht vs New Zealand

Ireland vs New Zealand

Ulster vs New Zealand

Barbarians vs New Zealand

References

External links
Tour page at allblacks.com

1989 in New Zealand rugby union
1989 rugby union tours
1989–90 in Irish rugby union
1989–90 in Welsh rugby union
1989–90 in European rugby union
1989
1989
1989
1989
1989